Güven Sak (born 1 January 1961) is a Turkish economist and academic.

Born in Bursa, Turkey, Sak graduated from the University of East Anglia with a master's degree in economics in 1984, and with a PhD in economics from the Middle East Technical University in 1994. He was a founding member of the Monetary Policy Committee of the Central Bank of the Republic of Turkey, to which he was appointed as an external member in 2001 for a five-year term. He was rector of TOBB University of Economics and Technology from 2011 to 2013, and is currently managing director of the Economic Policy Research Foundation of Turkey (TEPAV).

References

1961 births
Living people
Alumni of the University of East Anglia
Middle East Technical University alumni
Academic staff of Ankara University
Turkish economists